José Luis Mauro (born 10 March 1961 in Araraquara), commonly known as Vica, is a Brazilian football manager and former player who played as a central defender.

Club career statistics

Honours

Player
  Fluminense
 Campeonato Carioca: 1984, 1985
 Campeonato Brasileiro Série A: 1984

 Coritiba
 Campeonato Paranaense: 1989

Manager
Rio Branco-PR
 Campeonato Paranaense Série Prata: 1995

Goiás
 Copa Centro-Oeste: 2000

ASA
 Campeonato Alagoano: 2009, 2011
 Copa Alagoas: 2015

 Santa Cruz
 Campeonato Brasileiro Série C: 2013

External links

1961 births
Living people
People from Araraquara
Brazilian footballers
Association football defenders
Campeonato Brasileiro Série A players
Associação Ferroviária de Esportes players
Joinville Esporte Clube players
Fluminense FC players
Coritiba Foot Ball Club players
Comercial Futebol Clube (Ribeirão Preto) players
Club Athletico Paranaense players
Paraná Clube players
São José Esporte Clube players
Itumbiara Esporte Clube players
Rio Branco Sport Club players
Brazilian football managers
Campeonato Brasileiro Série B managers
Campeonato Brasileiro Série C managers
Rio Branco Sport Club managers
Itumbiara Esporte Clube managers
Associação Atlética Anapolina managers
Associação Desportiva São Caetano managers
Nacional Futebol Clube managers
Atlético Clube Goianiense managers
América Futebol Clube (SP) managers
Goiás Esporte Clube managers
Esporte Clube Santo André managers
Associação Atlética Internacional (Limeira) managers
Clube Recreativo e Atlético Catalano managers
Anápolis Futebol Clube managers
Rio Preto Esporte Clube managers
Londrina Esporte Clube managers
Grêmio Esportivo Catanduvense managers
Associação Atlética Caldense managers
Nacional Fast Clube managers
Agremiação Sportiva Arapiraquense managers
Fortaleza Esporte Clube managers
Treze Futebol Clube managers
Santa Cruz Futebol Clube managers
Paysandu Sport Club managers
Ríver Atlético Clube managers
Esporte Clube XV de Novembro (Piracicaba) managers
Botafogo Futebol Clube (SP) managers
Associação Portuguesa de Desportos managers
Footballers from São Paulo (state)